Gakiling Gewog (Dzongkha: དགའ་སྐྱིད་གླིང་) is a gewog (village block) of Sarpang District, Bhutan.

References 

Gewogs of Bhutan
Sarpang District